A tegula is a small sclerite with innervated bristles situated above the base of the costal vein in the wings of various insects such as Orthoptera, Lepidoptera, Hymenoptera, Diptera, and Auchenorrhyncha, and attached to the antero-lateral portion of the mesonotum.

The tegula in locusts is a model system for studying the role of feedback from mechanoreceptors during movement. In locusts, the tegula directly controls flight muscles. The motor neurons that control the activation of wing elevator muscles are phase-locked to the neurons that innervate the tegula such that when the tegula is electrically stimulated the elevator muscles initiate an upstroke. When the tegula is removed, locust flight is clumsy and disordered at first but most animals adapt, suggesting the use of other mechanoreceptors to control flight.

The tegula system is also a model for studying the role of neuromodulation for state-dependent motor control. Neural signals from the tegula only initiate wing muscle contraction when the animal is in flight (or fictive flight) due to endogenous release of the neuromodulator octopamine. This mechanism ensures that the animal does not initiate a wing stroke if the bristles are deflected by wind as the animal is walking.

References

Insect anatomy

la:Tegula